Pletikosić is a Serbo-Croatian surname. Notable people with the surname include:

 Matea Pletikosić, Croatian-Montenegrin handball player
 Stevan Pletikosić, Serbian sports shooter

Serbian surnames
Croatian surnames